The 1938–39 season was Arsenal's 20th consecutive season in the top division of English football.

Results
Arsenal's score comes first

Legend

Football League First Division

Final League table

FA Cup

Arsenal entered the FA Cup in the third round, in which they were drawn to face Chelsea.

See also

 1938–39 in English football
 List of Arsenal F.C. seasons

References

English football clubs 1938–39 season
1938-39